The 2013 Open GDF Suez Région Limousin was a professional tennis tournament played on indoor hard courts. It was the seventh edition of the tournament which was part of the 2013 ITF Women's Circuit, offering a total of $50,000 in prize money. It took place in Limoges, France, on 14–20 October 2013.

WTA entrants

Seeds 

 1 Rankings as of 7 October 2013

Other entrants 
The following players received wildcards into the singles main draw:
  Manon Arcangioli
  Mirjana Lučić-Baroni
  Victoria Muntean
  Marine Partaud

The following players received entry from the qualifying draw:
  Myrtille Georges
  Anhelina Kalinina
  Kinnie Laisné
  Nina Zander

Champions

Singles 

  Kristýna Plíšková def.  Tamira Paszek 3–6, 6–3, 6–2

Doubles 

  Viktorija Golubic /  Magda Linette def.  Nicole Clerico /  Nikola Fraňková 6–4, 6–4

External links 
 2013 Open GDF Suez Région Limousin at ITFtennis.com
  

2013 ITF Women's Circuit
2013 in French tennis
Open de Limoges